Upper Heyford is a village and civil parish  west of Northampton, just before Weedon,  Northamptonshire, England, not to be confused with one of the same name some 30 miles away across the county border in Oxfordshire.

Notable buildings
Heyford Mill lies a little to the west, along the River Nene in a valley which separates the village and Nether Heyford. The mill was derelict but underwent extensive restoration and refurbishment in 2008. The Mill is mentioned in the Domesday Book. In November 2008, South Northants Council decided to serve a "planning enforcement notice" on the developer alleging failure to comply with planning permission. The Council had previously served a court injunction against the developer to stop occupation of the property. The enforcement notice will require the demolition of the new buildings and other works on the historic site.

The mill fell into disuse in the 1960s. With the intention of saving its historic character, the Council granted planning permission in 2005 to restore and change the use of several derelict buildings at Heyford Mill after they had suffered arson and vandalism attacks. The site is in open countryside, part of the floodplain of the River Nene.

References

External links

Villages in Northamptonshire
West Northamptonshire District
Civil parishes in Northamptonshire